Louis de Silvestre (23 June 1675 – 11 April 1760) was a French portrait and history painter. He was court painter to King Augustus II of Poland, and director of the Royal Academy of Arts in Dresden.

Life and work

Sylvestre was born in Sceaux, south of Paris, the third son of Israel Silvestre, the notable engraver and drawing-master to the Grand Dauphin himself. Louis was taught initially by his father, then trained under Charles Le Brun and Bon Boullogne; he completed his studies in Rome, where he met Carlo Maratta, whose work had a great influence on him.

After his return to Paris, Sylvester entered the Académie de peinture et de sculpture in 1702 and was appointed professor in 1706. The main works he painted at this time were The Healing of the paralytic at the door of the Temple (1703) and the portrait of Louis XV (1715).

Friedrich August II, the prince-elector of Saxony, met Silvestre when he was in France and offered him the chance to work at the court of his father Augustus II, King of Poland. The artist accepted the offer, obtained permission from Louis XV, and set off on April 23, 1716; by 1718 he was living in Dresden. Both Augustus II and his son were great admirers of Silvestre's work, and bestowed upon him, in the space of thirty years, every honour imaginable: he was appointed first court painter, then, in 1727, director of the Royal Academy of Arts; he was ennobled in 1741, as was his brother Charles-François.

During this period, Silvestre completed, with the help of his wife, Marie-Catherine Hérault, many oil paintings and frescos, either in Dresden or in Warsaw. He painted many portraits of the King and Queen, as well as those of other leading aristocrats. He was responsible for the most important works in the Palace of Dresden, notably, subjects drawn from Ovid's Metamorphoses for several ceremonial bedrooms and several ceilings.

During the time he remained at the court of Dresden, Silvestre was known as much for his personality and his distinguished friends, as by his artistic talents. The great number of works that came from his brush and the generosity of his patrons allowed him to amass a considerable fortune, and, having achieved financial security, he retired and returned to France. Louis XV awarded him a pension of 1000 crowns and apartments in the Palais du Louvre itself. In 1752 he was appointed director of the Academy of Paris.

Louis de Silvestre died in Paris at the Palais du Louvre on 11 April 1760.

"As for art", says Mariette, "he was not a painter without merit, but his style had nothing that was new or too exciting; one saw only in him a good follower of Bon Boulogne."

Amongst Silvestre's students was the painter Jean-Eleazar Schenau, who later became director of the Dresden Academy and of the Meissen porcelain factory. His daughter Marie-Maximilienne also became a painter.

Works

 Arion jouant de la lyre, Louvre, Paris;
 La Cène, musée national du château et des Trianons, Versailles Museum;
 La Mort d’Adonis, Musée Magnin, Dijon;
 Louis XIV reçoit à Fontainebleau le prince électeur de Saxe. 27 septembre 1714, Versailles museum;
 Saint Benoit ressuscite un enfant, Louvre, Paris;
 Entrevue de l’impératrice Amélie, veuve de l’empereur Joseph I, avec son gendre Auguste III, roi de Pologne, et sa famille, à Neuhaus, en Bohême, le 24 mai 1737, avec une infinité de portraits de personnages du temps; Large painting, 17 ft 6 ins in height, by 23 ft 9 ins long. Engraved by Francesco Zucchi, Dresden Gallery; another version of the  Entrevue de Neuhaus is at the Louvre;
 Portrait de la femme d’Auguste III, en princesse électorale;
 Hercule poursuit Nessus, qui s’enfuit avec Déjanire, Dresden Gallery;
 Auguste II, roi de Pologne, donnant la main à Frédéric-Guillaume I, Dresden Gallery;
 Portrait de Christian V, roi de Danemark, Dresden Gallery;
 Portrait de son frère Georges, mari de la reine Anne, Dresden Gallery;
 Portrait de Georges, fils de la princesse Lubomirska, plus tard princesse de Teschen, appelé le chevalier de Saxe, Dresden Gallery;
 Portrait of the Countess Lubomirska, Dresden State Art Collections.
 Portrait du comte Kosel, fils de la baronne de Hoymb. Gravé par Tardieu, Dresden Gallery;
 Portrait du comte Rudoffsky, général en chef de l’armée saxonne, Dresden Gallery;
 Portrait du général comté Gastelli, Dresden Gallery;
 Portrait d’Antoine Rosdraziewsky, référendaire de la couronne de Pologne, Dresden Gallery;
 Portrait du général comte de Kœnigseck, Dresden Gallery;
 Portrait d’Auguste II, roi de Pologne, Dresden Gallery
 Le même à cheval, Dresden Gallery;
 Portrait d’Auguste III, King of Pologne, Dresden Gallery;
 Portrait d’Auguste III, King of Pologne, Royal Castle, Warsaw;
 Portrait de Marie-Josèphe, Queen-consort of Poland; figure jusqu’aux genoux, Engraved by Schmidt, Von Marrées Gallery, Berlin;
 Un cavalier de la cour d’Auguste II, en masque avec une cornemuse, Von Marrées Gallery, Berlin;
 Allégorie sur l’éducation d’un prince de Saxe, Hermitage Museum, Saint Petersburg;
 Allégorie sur la naissance d’un prince de la maison de Saxe, Hermitage Museum, Saint Petersburge.
 Portrait of the Countess Orzelska, Palace on the Water, Warsaw.

References

This article incorporates text from the French Wikipedia, Louis de Silvestre

Bibliography 
Gemäldegalerie Alte Meister, "Old Masters Picture Gallery" in the Zwinger Palace, Dresden.
 Harald Marx: Silvestre, Louis de. In: Neue Deutsche Biographie (NDB). Band 24, Duncker & Humblot, Berlin 2010, S. 418–420 (Digitalisat).
 Dorota Ewa Olczak: Louis de Silvestre (1675 - 1760) als Porträtmaler in Dresden : über Vorbilder und Vorlagen seiner Kunst mit kritischem Werkkatalog; Teil 1; [Teil 2] / vorgelegt von Dorota Ewa Olczak . - [Mikrofiche-Ausg.] 2013. - 167, 422 S., Berlin, Freie Univ., Diss., 2013.

External links

Portrait of Louis de Silvestre by Maurice-Quentin de La Tour (French, 1704 - 1788) (J. Paul Getty Museum)
Louis de Silvestre "le jeune" (1675-1760) (Israel Sylvestre et ses Descendants)

French muralists
Court painters of Polish kings
French portrait painters
1675 births
1760 deaths
17th-century French painters
French male painters
18th-century French painters
French expatriates in Poland
French history painters
18th-century French male artists